Rusheva may refer to:

Nadya Rusheva, a Russian artist
3516 Rusheva, an asteroid named after Nadya Rusheva